Manny Lopez may refer to:

 Manny SD Lopez, Filipino activist
 Manny Lopez (legislator), House representative for Manila's 1st congressional district
 Manny Lopez, a minor character in the American TV series George Lopez